Santee State Park is in the Sandhills of South Carolina on the western edge of the   Lake Marion. It is located off SC 6, three miles (5 km) northwest of the town of Santee and I-95.

The park offers boating, hiking, camping, birding, canoeing and kayaking.  Well known for fishing, this park offers a chance to catch record size Largemouth Bass. Other fish that abound are Striped bass, Channel catfish, Trout, White Perch, White bass, Crappie, Shellcrackers and Bream and Chain (Jack). Lake Marion can be accessed by two boat ramps that the park has.

The  park was created in 1942 when Orangeburg County donated the land. It has 2 campgrounds. Cypress View Campground has 50 sites and Lakeshore Campground has 108 sites. Restroom facilities with hot showers are accessible by both campgrounds. Many sites can accommodate RVs up to 40 feet in length. There are also 30 rondette cabins, each with 2 bedrooms and 1 bath, 10 of which are on piers over the lake.

The park has 3 hiking trails and 1 biking trail. The "Limestone Nature Trail" and the "Oak Pinolly Nature Trail" are 1 mile hiking trails. The "Sinkhole Pond Nature Trail" is a half mile hiking trail. The biking trail is 7 miles long.

References

External links
 Park Map
 Trail Map

Santee
Protected areas of Orangeburg County, South Carolina